John Warner Lord (September 23, 1904 – March 11, 1958) was an American football player. He played college football for Rutgers and professional football in the National Football League (NFL) for the Staten Island Stapletons. He appeared in eight NFL games, two as a starter, during the 1929 season.

References

1904 births
1958 deaths
Rutgers Scarlet Knights football players
Staten Island Stapletons players
Players of American football from New Jersey
People from Avon-by-the-Sea, New Jersey